Erbium(III) nitrate is an inorganic compound, a salt of erbium and nitric acid with the chemical formula Er(NO3)3. The compound forms pink crystals, readily soluble in water, also forms crystalline hydrates.

Synthesis
Dissolving metallic erbium in nitric acid:

Dissolving erbium oxide or hydroxide in nitric acid:

Reaction of nitrogen dioxide with metallic erbium:

Physical properties
Erbium(III) nitrate forms pink hygroscopic crystals.

Forms crystalline hydrates of the composition Er(NO3)3*5H2O.

Both erbium(III) nitrate and its crystalline hydrate decompose on heating.

Dissolves in water and EtOH.

Chemical properties
The hydrated erbium nitrate thermally decomposed to form ErONO3 and then to erbium oxide.

Applications
It is used to obtain metallic erbium and is also used as a chemical reagent.

References

Erbium compounds
Nitrates